Robsonodendron is a genus of flowering plants in the family Celastraceae. It contains 2 species which occur in Africa.

Species
Ronsonodendron eucleiforme
Robsonodendron maritimum

References

https://web.archive.org/web/20110927115346/http://www.nmmu.ac.za/documents/richardcowling/01_Cowling%20et%20al%20SAJBot%2071,%201-23.pdf

Celastrales genera
Celastraceae